Art Journal or art journal may refer to:

 an art journal, a periodical on the topic of art
 Art diary, also known as an art journal, a daily journal kept by artists
 The Art Journal, a 19th-century British art magazine
 Art Journal (College Art Association journal), an American art journal, 1941–present
 Art Journal of the National Gallery of Victoria, also known as Art Journal, an Australian journal published under this name since 2011